Zabel is the surname of the following people:
Bryce Zabel (born 1954), American television producer, director, writer and actor
Carl Zabel (1837–?), American merchant and manufacturer
David Zabel, American television producer and writer
Erik Zabel (born 1970), German road bicycle racer, father of Rick
Hermann Zabel (1832–1912), German botanist
Igor Zabel (1958–2005), Slovene art historian, curator, writer and essayist
Jim Zabel (1921–2013), American sports broadcaster
Joe Zabel (born 1953), American comic book artist
Mark Zabel (born 1973), German sprint canoer and surfski competitor
Nellie Zabel Willhite (1892–1991), American aviator
Rick Zabel (born 1993), German road bicycle racer, son of Erik
Sarah E. Zabel (born 1965), American government official
Steve Zabel (born 1948), American football player
Zip Zabel (1891–1970), American baseball pitcher